Mamoru Takahashi (born 11 April 1956) is a Japanese professional golfer.

Takahashi played on the Japan Golf Tour, winning twice.

Professional wins (2)

Japan Golf Tour wins (2)

External links

Japanese male golfers
Japan Golf Tour golfers
1956 births
Living people